St. John Paul II STEM Academy at Bellarmine-Jefferson  was a private, Roman Catholic STEM high school in Burbank, California, launched in August, 2019.  It was located in the Roman Catholic Archdiocese of Los Angeles at the former site of Bellarmine-Jefferson High School, which closed in 2018. St. John Paul II STEM Academy closed in 2020 after one year of operation.

Background
St. John Paul II STEM Academy was created through the initiative of the Archdiocese of Los Angeles to continue to offer the best possible options for Catholic schooling in the community of Burbank. The school was located at the former site of Bellarmine-Jefferson High School, which closed in 2018.

Academics

JP2 STEM Academy had two specialize pathways: Engineering and Media Arts. The academic day was to feature a 4×4 block schedule. Students would take four semester-length courses at a time, arranged in a block schedule. Students would also complete courses in ethics and humanities. In order to graduate, each senior would have completed a Capstone Project.

See also
 St. Robert Bellarmine Catholic Church

Notes and references

External links
 School Website

High schools in the San Fernando Valley
Educational institutions established in 1944
Buildings and structures in Burbank, California
Roman Catholic secondary schools in Los Angeles County, California
1944 establishments in California
Catholic secondary schools in California